This article presents a list of compositions by Louis Couperin.

Harpsichord music
Couperin's harpsichord music was catalogued by musicologist Bruce Gustafson. The same numbering scheme is used in the 1985 Éditions de l'Oiseau-Lyre edition, as well as in the first complete harpsichord works recording, by Davitt Moroney. The Baroque suite was not codified at the time, so French dances are found in manuscripts grouped by tonality. This approach is used here, as well, with some deviations reflecting the diverse nature of the sources.

Organ music
The vast majority of Couperin's organ pieces—the contents of the so-called Oldham manuscript—were unknown until 1957, and remained unpublished until 2003. The numbering in the following list is derived from the Éditions de l'Oiseau-Lyre (OL) edition (Monaco, 2003, 135 p.), the only available as of 2016 (but indefinitely out of print). Many of the pieces in the Oldham manuscript (still unavailable) are inscribed with the date of composition and/or the composer's name; these notices are reproduced here (with respect to the original spelling and punctuation) to facilitate navigation. The order of the pieces is similar to the one in the Oldham manuscript modern edition.

 Duretez Fantaisie (Couperin le 8e Nov 1650)
 Fantaisie (Couperin le 15e Novembre 1650)
 Fugue Grave sur Urbs Beata Jherusalem (Couperin 1654)
 Autre Fugue Grave sur le mesme subject (A Paris le 15e Octobre 1656)
 Urbs Beata Jherusalem en Haulte Contre avec le poulce droict ou en trio (Couperin 1657)
 Conditor en Haultecontre avec le poulce droict en trio (Couperin)
 Conditor (Couperin a paris le 26e Novembre 1656)
 Conditor a 2 dessus (Couperin a paris Le 3e Decembre 1656)
 Ave Maris Stella (Couperin au mois d'Aoust 1658)
 Ave Maris Stella. Trio (Couperin a paris Le 1er Janvier 1657)
 Fugue (Couperin a Meudon le 18e Juillet 1656)
 Fantaisie (Couperin)
 Fantaisie (Couperin a Meudon le 8e Octobre 1656)
 Duo (Couperin a Toulouze le unz? Octobre 1659)
 Fantaisie (Couperin a Paris au mois de Decembre 1656) - also in the Bauyn Manuscript
 Duo (Couperin) - also in the Bauyn Manuscript
 Fugue (Couperin a Meudon le 20e Septembre 1656)
 (Fugue) (Couperin a paris Le 18e Febvrier 1657)
 Fugue (Couperin a paris le 1er 7bre 1656)
 Fugue sur le Cromhorne (Couperin a Meudon le 1er Aoust 1656)
 Fantaisie (Couperin au mois de Mars 1656)
 Fantaisie (Couperin a paris le 22e May 1656)
 Fantaisie (Couperin)
 Fantaisie (Couperin le 8 mai 1656)
 Fantaisie (Couperin)
 Fantaisie (Couperin Org de S Gervais le 4e Juillet 1653 a Paris)
 Fantaisie (Couperin 1654)
 Fugue (Couperin 1654)
 Fugue qu’il faut jouer d’un mouvement fort lent sur la tierce du Grand Clavier avec le tremblant lent (Couperin a paris le 14e Mars 1655)
 Fantaisie (Couperin a paris le 28e Aoust 1655)
 Ut Queant Laxis (Trio) (Couperin 2e Decembre 1656)
 Ut Queant Laxis (Trio) (Couperin a Paris au mois de decembre 1656)
 Iste Confessor (Trio)
 Pange Lingua en basse (Couperin)
 Pange Lingua (Trio) (Couperin 1656)
 Pange Lingua (Couperin 1656)
 Beata Nobis Gaudia (Couperin a Paris le 22e Janvier 1657)
 Beata Nobis Gaudia. Trio (Couperin a Paris le 25e Janvier 1657)
 Jesu Salvator Sæculi (Couperin a Paris le 10e Apvril 1657)
 Tristes Erant Apostoli (Couperin a Paris le 11e? Apvril 1657)
 A Solis en Taille (Couperin a Paris le 11e? Apvril 1657)
 A Solis en Haulte Contre (Couperin)
 A Solis. Trio (Couperin a paris 1656)
 A Solis en basse (Couperin 1656)
 A Solis En triple. A la Haulte Contre (A Toulouze le 5e decembre 1659 - Couperin)
 Prelude Autre Livre. Grand Livre d’Orgue - "Il faut jouer cecy d'un Mouvemen fort lent" (Couperin 1654)
 Fantaisie (Couperin 1651)
 Fantaisie (Couperin a paris le 12e Aoust 1651)
 Fantaisie (Couperin 1654)
 Regina Coeli (Couperin)
 Invitatoire pour le Jour de Pasques (Couperin)
 Invitatoire de la Trinité (Couperin)
 Invitatoire de la Feste Dieu (Couperin)
 Ad Coenam Agni Providi comme il se chante au Montmartre (Couperin)
 (Ad Coenam Agni Providi) 3e Verset (Couperin)
 Fantaisie 2me Livre (Couperin a paris le 3e May 1656)
 Fantaisie sur le Cromhorne (Couperin 1655 au mois de Septembre)
 Fantaisie sur la tierce du Grand Clavier (Couperin)
 Fantaisie (Couperin a Paris le 15e may 1656)
 Fugue Renversée (Couperin a paris le 15e Juillet 1656)
 Fugue (Couperin a paris le 22e Juillet 1656)
 Fugue (Couperin a Meudon le 4e octobre 1656)
 Fugue sur la tierce du Grand Clavier (Couperin a paris le 6e Octobre 1656)
 Fugue sur la tierce (Couperin a Paris le 15e Novembre 1657)
 Fugue sur le Cromhorne (Couperin Commencée a Meudon & achevée a paris au mois de Novembre 1658)
 Fantaisie (Couperin le 8e Octobre Mil six cent cinquante)
 Fantaisie (le 15e octobre 1651, a paris Couperin)
 Fantaisie (Au mois de Novembre 1655 - Couperin)
 Fantaisie (Couperin)
 Fantaisie (Couperin a Meudon 1656)

2 Carillons (for All Saints vespers) in : "Recueil de plusieurs vieux Airs faits aux Sacres, Couronnements, Mariages et autres Solennitez, faits sous les Règnes de François Ier, Henry 3, Henry 4 et Louis 13. Avec plusieurs Concerts faits pour leurs divertissement(s). Recueillis par Philidor l’Aisné en 1690".

Other works
 2 fantasies for 2 viols
 1 simphonie, for one instrument and basso continuo
 2 symphonies, for two instruments and basso continuo
 2 fantasies à 5 for shawm band
 2 fantasies à 5 (for strings?)

References
 Louis Couperin: Pièces de clavecin, ed. Alan Curtis, Paris, Heugel. coll. Le Pupitre, no 18, 1975, 171 p.
 Louis Couperin: Pièces de clavecin, ed. Davitt Moroney (Éditions de l'Oiseau-Lyre OL 58, Monaco, 1985)
 Louis Couperin: Pièces d'orgue, ed. Guy Oldham, notes by Davitt Moroney, (Éditions de l'Oiseau-Lyre OL 300, Monaco, 2003)

Scores

Couperin, Louis